Wrelton is a village and civil parish in the Ryedale district of North Yorkshire, England. It is on the A170 road and 2 miles west of Pickering.

History
Wrelton is mentioned in the Domesday Book as having seven villagers, one ploughland, and a meadow covering . The name of the village is thought to derive from the Old English wearg-hyll (felon hill). The suggestion of the full name would translate as farm by or on the gallows-hill.

Wrelton's nearest town is Pickering, and is 30 minutes away from Scarborough. Its nearest city is York, which is 45 minutes away. Wrelton is home to holiday cottages, bed and breakfasts, a local pub and holiday home park, chapel and village hall. 
Villages surrounding and near Wrelton include, Cropton, Middleton, Rosedale and Aislaby.

In 1992, a bypass for the A170 road was built to the south of the village. The £730,000 road was opened on 15 April 1992. The number 128 bus between Helmsley and Scarborough, calls at the village six times a day in each direction. Journey times to Scarborough are just over an hour.

Population
The table below lists the population of the village of Wrelton only;

a = estimated

In 2001 and 2011, the census has included the entire civil parish, which also includes the village of Aislaby to the west. In 2001, the population was recorded as being 331, and in 2011 as 332. In 2015, North Yorkshire County Council estimated the population of Wrelton to be 230 in 2011, and 250 in 2015. Aislaby was deemed to have had a static population of 100 in 2011 and 2015.

References

External links

Map of the village buildings
Village website

Villages in North Yorkshire
Civil parishes in North Yorkshire